Nadolna  is a village in the administrative district of Gmina Chlewiska, within Szydłowiec County, Masovian Voivodeship, in east-central Poland.

The village has a population of 159.

References

Nadolna